Montreal Main is a Canadian docufiction film, released in 1974.

The film centres on Frank (Vitale) and Bozo (Moyle), two friends of ambiguous sexuality living in the bohemian arts community of Montreal, Quebec. Frank develops a friendship with Johnny (John Sutherland), a 12-year-old boy, while Bozo is developing a new relationship with Jackie (Jackie Holden), a friend of Johnny's parents. Although Frank's relationship with Johnny is platonic and non-sexual, the common stereotype of gay men as pedophiles prone to sexually preying on underage boys begins to colour the community's and Johnny's parents' judgement of the friendship, driving a wedge between them as even Frank is increasingly driven to question his own motivations.

The film is also a philosophical exploration of the contrast between existentialism and essentialism.

The same core group of Vitale, Lack and Moyle also collaborated on the 1978 film The Rubber Gun.

The film was rereleased on DVD in 2009, and was the subject of a critical analysis by Thomas Waugh and Jason Garrison in 2011, as part of Arsenal Pulp Press' Queer Film Classics series.

Cast
 Frank Vitale as Frank
 Stephen Lack as Steve
 Peter Brawley as Peter
 Allan Moyle as Bozo
 John Sutherland as Johnny
 Jackie Holden as Jackie

References

External links

1974 films
Canadian LGBT-related films
1974 LGBT-related films
LGBT-related drama films
Films set in Montreal
Films shot in Montreal
Canadian independent films
Canadian docufiction films
English-language Canadian films
1974 drama films
1974 directorial debut films
1970s English-language films
1970s Canadian films